Hierotheus I served as Greek Orthodox Patriarch of Alexandria between 1825 and 1845.

References

19th-century Greek Patriarchs of Alexandria